Irini Vasiliou (born 18 March 1990) is a Greek sprinter. She competed in the 400 metres at the 2016 European Athletics Championships. At the 2016 Summer Olympics and the 2020 Summer Olympics she competed in the 400 metres.

Her twin sister Anna is also a 400 metres athlete.

Competition record

References

External links
 

1990 births
Living people
Greek female sprinters
Athletes from Heraklion
Olympic athletes of Greece
Athletes (track and field) at the 2016 Summer Olympics
Athletes (track and field) at the 2020 Summer Olympics
Twin sportspeople
Greek twins
Athletes (track and field) at the 2018 Mediterranean Games
Mediterranean Games competitors for Greece
Olympic female sprinters